Mount Fiedler is one of the Bender Mountains,  high, standing between the edge of the Ross Ice Shelf and the Watson Escarpment. It was named by the Advisory Committee on Antarctic Names for Leonard G. Fiedler, an electrician with the Byrd Station winter parties of 1960 and 1964.

See also
Mount Mahan

References 

Mountains of Marie Byrd Land